Aleksandr Silayev (2 April 1928 – 31 December 2005) was a Russian sprint canoeist who competed for the Soviet Union in the late 1950s and early 1960s. He won a silver medal in the C-1 1,000 m event at the 1960 Summer Olympics, as well as a world title in the C-2 10,000 m event in 1958. At the European championships he won two gold and one silver medals (in 1957 and 1959) in the C-2 1,000 and 10,000 m events.

References

External links

1928 births
2005 deaths
Canoeists at the 1960 Summer Olympics
Soviet male canoeists
Olympic canoeists of the Soviet Union
Olympic silver medalists for the Soviet Union
Olympic medalists in canoeing
Russian male canoeists
ICF Canoe Sprint World Championships medalists in Canadian

Medalists at the 1960 Summer Olympics